USS William R. Rush had been the name of more than one United States Navy ship, and may refer to:

 , a destroyer escort cancelled before construction began in 1944
 , a destroyer escort cancelled before construction began in 1944
 , a destroyer in commission from 1945 to 1978

See also
 

United States Navy ship names